Commander Cody and His Lost Planet Airmen is the fifth album by American rock band Commander Cody and His Lost Planet Airmen. Released in 1975, it was their first album for Warner Bros. Records.

The album was the subject of the 1977 book Star-Making Machinery by Geoffrey Stokes, which chronicled its recording, production and marketing as an example of the behind-the-scenes operation of the U.S. music industry in the 1970s.

Critical reception 

On AllMusic, Jana Pendragon wrote, "... this is another good outing for the wild boys.... One more time, this band holds all the aces and plays every hand with a poker face that just won't quit. Commander Cody & His Lost Planet Airmen knew exactly what they were doing."

Star-Making Machinery 
The AllMusic reviewer, however, did not view the album in the context of the times, and was unaware of the struggles and conflicts that plagued the actual recording of the album.  This was Cody's first album for Warner Brothers Records after leaving Paramount Records.  Warners believed their twang-laden style, rooted in rockabilly, honky-tonk, vintage rhythm & blues and western swing was limiting their appeal.  The label decided to move the group in a mellow, California country-rock style more akin to Poco,  The Eagles and other bands rooted in folk and bluegrass.

The book Star-Making Machinery: The Odyssey of an Album by Geoffrey Stokes chronicled the actual recording sessions.  Stokes embedded himself with the band and witnessed the conflicts that took place between the musicians and producer. Members of the Airman were conflicted. They preferred their original style, but were anxious greater commercial success after years of struggle.  Their producer, John Boylan, a veteran deeply rooted in West Coast country-rock, was attempting to guide them toward the softer sound, which resulted in conflicts during the recording process.  Other critics who reviewed the album at the time were far less enthused about it, as was the band itself.  The album was far from successful.

Track listing 
Side A
 "Southbound" (Hoyt Axton, Mark Dawson) – 2:20
 "Don't Let Go" (Jesse Stone) – 2:40
 "California Okie" (Kevin "Blackie" Farrell) – 2:48
 "Willin'" (Lowell George) – 3:38
 "The Boogie Man Boogie" (Michael J. Richards, Billy C. Farlow, George Frayne, John Tichy) – 3:35
Side B
 "Hawaii Blues" (Richards, Farlow, Ernie Hagar, Andy Stein) – 3:05
 "House of Blue Lights" (Don Raye, Freddie Slack) – 2:41
 "Keep On Lovin' Her" (Farlow, Tichy) – 3:13
 "Devil and Me" (Frayne, Tichy) – 3:11
 "Four or Five Times" (Marco H. Hellman, Byron Gay) – 2:30
 "That's What I Like About the South" (Phil Harris) – 2:35

Personnel 
Commander Cody and His Lost Planet Airmen
Commander Cody (a.k.a. George Frayne) – piano, vocals
Billy C. Farlow – lead vocal, harp
Bill Kirchen – electric guitar, vocals
John Tichy – rhythm guitar, vocals
Andy Stein – fiddle, saxophone
Ernie Hagar – pedal steel
Bruce Barlow – bass, vocals
Lance Dickerson – drums, vocals
Additional musicians
Tower Of Power Horn Section – horns
Production
John Boylan – Producer
Paul Grupp – Engineer
Tom Anderson – Assistant Engineer,
Bob Edwards – Assistant Engineer
Michael Verdick – Assistant Engineer
Wally Traugott – Mastering
Chris Frayne – Cover Art
John Goodchild – Layout Design

References

1975 albums
Commander Cody and His Lost Planet Airmen albums
Albums produced by John Boylan (record producer)
Warner Records albums